The Seeker is an album by indie rock band Cloud Cult. It was released on February 12, 2016 to positive acclaim. It marked Cloud Cult's first album partially funded through PledgeMusic, a crowd sourcing service for bands.

Track listing
Living in Awe
To the Great Unknown
Days to Remember
Chromatica
Come Home
No Hell
Everything You Thought You Had
Time Machine Invention
The Pilgrimage
Three Storms Until You Learn to Float
You Never Were Alone
Prelude to an End
Through the Ages

References

External links

2016 albums
Cloud Cult albums